The 1939 Buffalo Bulls football team was an American football team that represented the University of Buffalo as an independent during the 1939 college football season. In its fourth season under head coach Jim Peele, the team compiled a 0–7 record. The team played its home games at Rotary Field in Buffalo, New York.

Schedule

References

Buffalo
Buffalo Bulls football seasons
Buffalo Bulls football
College football winless seasons